The Mannkal Economic Education Foundation is a free market think tank headquartered in Perth, Western Australia.

Location
The think tank is located at 3/31 on Hood Street in Subiaco, Western Australia, a suburb of Perth.

Overview
It was founded in 1997 by Executive Director Ron Manners. Since its founding, Mannkal has sent over 500 students to various conferences in Australia and overseas.

Mannkal aims to "strengthen the free market system in Western Australia and Australia, by promoting ideals of voluntary co-operation, choice, personal rights, limited government and responsible resourcefulness of individuals." It does this by financing and organising:
 Events that allow individuals to exchange ideas defending free markets.
 Seminars and student scholarships to promote the greater understanding of the concepts that underpin free societies.
 Policy papers on relevant topics pertaining to Western Australia.
 An alternative book store for economic and Australian history books.

Board of directors
 Ron Manners, Chairman.
 Neil Fearis, Director.
 Jenny Manners, Director.
 Mac Nichols, Director.
 Lyndon Rowe, Director.
 Bill Stacey, Director.
 David Stevens, Director.

References

External links
 Official website

Think tanks based in Australia
Libertarianism in Australia
Libertarian think tanks
Organizations established in 1997
1997 establishments in Australia
Subiaco, Western Australia